Frances Emma (Fanny) Hines (1864–August 7, 1900) was a nurse from Victoria, Australia who served in the Boer War. She was the first Australian woman to die on active service.

Early life 
Frances Emma Hines was born in 1864 in Apsley, Victoria, the fourth daughter of Francis Patrick Hines and his wife Eleanor Mary Caroline (née Brewer). She attended the Fairlight Private Girls School in East St Kilda (later the Clyde School) and then trained as a nurse at the Melbourne Hospital for Sick Children.

Military service 
In March 1900, Sister Hines was one of ten trained nurses who travelled on the Euryalus to South Africa with the 3rd Imperial Bushmen's Contingent.

Death
Sister Hines was nursing at Enkeldoorn with sole responsibility for 26 patients,  which damaged her own health. She died on 7 August 1900 from pneumonia aggravated by malnutrition in an army hospital in Bulawayo, Rhodesia (now Zimbabwe). She was buried with full military honours in Bulawayo. A marble cross was placed on her grave, funded by her fellow nurses and Victorian Citizen Bushmen. On 27 September 1901, a tablet to her memory was unveiled by Major-General Downes at Fairlight School, erected through subscriptions of her former classmates.

References

1864 births
1900 deaths
Female wartime nurses
People of the Boer Wars
People from Victoria (Australia)
Deaths from pneumonia in Zimbabwe
Australian military personnel of the Second Boer War
Australian women nurses
Australian military nurses
Australian military personnel killed in the Second Boer War
Military personnel from Victoria (Australia)